Sea Hags is the eponymous only album by the American hard rock band Sea Hags. It was released in 1989 through Chrysalis Records. During recording, the band's line up changed several times as the label and the band did not think they were capable of producing the right sound. After the album was released, the band went on a European tour, where they promptly broke up.

The members had thoughts about reforming in 1991, but when bassist and founding member Chris Schlosshardt died of pneumonia, the band's fate was sealed. His death also contributed to the dissolution of another band, The Nymphs. That band's lead singer, Inger Lorre, was Schlosshardt's girlfriend, and she went back to New Jersey in the wake of his death.

The album was remastered and re-released in 2007 by Rock Candy with previously unreleased demos of "Doghouse" and "Half the Way Valley" and expanded liner notes.

Track listing

Personnel
Ron Yocom – vocals, rhythm guitar
Frankie Wilsey – lead guitar
Chris Schlosshardt – bass guitar
Adam Maples – drums

Other musicians
Kevin Russell – guitar

References

1989 debut albums
Albums produced by Mike Clink
Sea Hags albums